Mirror Lake is a lake in the high Uinta Mountains in Utah. It is a popular fishing and recreation spot. The lake contains three species of trout: rainbow, brook, and tiger.  The lake has a Forest Service campground, picnic facilities, and a boat ramp for non-motorized watercraft. Access to the lake is by the Mirror Lake Highway, which is only open during the summer (other than by snowmobile).

The lake's name comes from the near-perfect reflection of the surrounding mountains and trees seen from a roadside overlook or from the shore. The shoreline is owned by the Uinta-Wasatch-Cache National Forest.

Mirror Lake includes the adjacent Mirror Lake Campground, with latrines, day-use areas and 94 campsites. The water that enters the lake is overflow from Pass Lake located just above Mirror Lake. The outflow is the headwaters of the Duchesne River.

References

External links
 Wasatch-Cache National Forest.gov: Mirror Lake
 Scenicutah.com: Images of Mirror Lake in Utah
 Utahfishinginfo.com: Fishing at Mirror Lake

Lakes of Utah
Features of the Uinta Mountains
Lakes of Duchesne County, Utah
Wasatch-Cache National Forest